Metallurgical analysis (冶金分析, in Chinese) is a monthly science magazine based in Beijing, China. The magazine was founded in 1981. It is owned by Central Research Institute of Iron and Steel of China (中国钢铁研究总院). The publisher is the metallurgical analysis editorial department. The magazine mostly features articles on the chemical analysis.

Topics covered
Detecting and monitoring techniques for production process control
Sampling and sample preparation
On-line analysis and control
Surface and coating analysis
Health and environmental analysis
Quality control and laboratory management
Advanced reviews on different fields of material analysis & testing techniques
Standardization, certification, accreditation and verification.

In determining the suitability of submitted articles for publication, particular scrutiny will be placed on the degree of novelty and significance of the research and the extent to which it adds to existing knowledge in material analysis.

References

External links
 
 

1981 establishments in China
Chinese-language magazines
Magazines established in 1981
Magazines published in Beijing
Science and technology magazines
Monthly magazines published in China